Alex Chin (born 3 February 2000) is a Hong Kong professional footballer of partial Tongan descent who plays as a goalkeeper for Hong Kong First Division club South China.

Club career
Chin started his senior career with Hong Kong Premier League club Tai Po.

On 7 November 2020, Chin signed with Hong Kong First Division club South China.

International career
Chin is eligible to represent Tonga internationally through his mother.

References

External links
 

2000 births
Living people
Hong Kong footballers
Hong Kong Premier League players
Hong Kong First Division League players
Tai Po FC players
South China AA players
Association football goalkeepers
Hong Kong people of Tongan descent